Rhophilin-2 is a protein that in humans is encoded by the RHPN2 gene.

Interactions 

RHPN2 has been shown to interact with RHOB.

References

Further reading